Andre Darnell Reed (born January 29, 1964) is an American former professional football player who was a wide receiver in the National Football League (NFL) for 16 seasons, primarily with the Buffalo Bills. He played college football at Kutztown and was selected by the Bills in the fourth round of the 1985 NFL Draft with the 86th overall selection. Following 15 seasons with the Bills, where he earned Pro Bowl honors seven times, Reed spent his final season as a member of the Washington Redskins in 2000.

Reed currently ranks 15th in all-time NFL touchdown receptions with 87 and ninth in all-time NFL post-season receptions with 85.

At the time of his 2001 retirement, Reed was second in all-time NFL career receptions. He was inducted into the Pro Football Hall of Fame in 2014.

Early life and high school
Reed was born in Allentown, Pennsylvania on January 29, 1964. He began his football career at Allentown's Dieruff High School, where he played quarterback and competed in the Eastern Pennsylvania Conference, which is known for producing top collegiate and NFL football talent.  In his senior year in 1981, Reed helped lead Dieruff to an EPC tri-championship, tying for the championship with Emmaus High School and Whitehall High School.

College
Reed then attended Kutztown University, where he moved to the wide receiver position and quickly drew the attention of the NFL for his speed and durability at the receiver position.  He set nine school records and finished his college career with 142 receptions for 2,020 yards and 14 touchdowns.

National Football League

Buffalo Bills
In the 1985 NFL Draft, Reed was drafted by the Buffalo Bills in the fourth round with the 86th overall selection, making him just the second player ever from Kutztown to be selected in an NFL Draft (the first being Don Shaver in 1981).  Reed played for the Bills for 15 consecutive seasons, from 1985 through 1999, during which he played in four Super Bowls. He was released in the 2000 offseason along with fellow longtime Bills' players Thurman Thomas and Bruce Smith after the team found itself in severe salary cap trouble; the roster dump began a period of downfall from which the Buffalo Bills did not reach the playoffs until the 2017 season.

"The Comeback"

In addition to the important role he played in taking the Bills to four consecutive Super Bowls, Reed is also remembered for his contributions to the Bills' January 3, 1993, playoff victory over the Houston Oilers, a game that has come to be known simply as "The Comeback."  In the game, which Houston led 35–3 during the third quarter, Reed caught 3 touchdowns in the second half, leading Buffalo's rally from a 32-point deficit in what became the largest comeback in NFL history. Reed finished the game with eight receptions for 136 yards and three touchdowns.  The game has been enshrined in NFL history as one of the greatest games ever played.  It also is recognized as one of the largest comebacks by any team in the history of all of the American professional sports.

Following the Bills' victory against the Oilers, Reed went on to catch eight passes for 152 yards in the Bills' 52–17 Super Bowl XXVII loss, on January 31, 1993, to the Dallas Cowboys.

Denver Broncos and Washington Redskins
In 2000, Reed signed a two-year contract with the Denver Broncos in June but was buried on the depth chart behind Rod Smith, Ed McCaffrey, Robert Brooks and Travis McGriff. Reed eventually asked for his release from the Broncos after then Broncos Head Coach Mike Shanahan informed Reed that he would be inactive for their 2000 season opener and wanted to make a more immediate contribution. He eventually joined the Washington Redskins and retired after the 2000 season.

NFL records
Reed ranks 15th in all-time NFL history in touchdown receptions with 87 and ninth in NFL history in all-time post-season receptions with 85 as of 2022.

He exceeded 1,000 receiving yards four times in a 16-year career and rushed for 500 yards and a touchdown on 75 carries. With the Bills, Reed played in four consecutive Super Bowls (1991–1994) and was selected to the Pro Bowl in seven consecutive seasons (1988–1994). He set season career highs with 90 receptions in 1994, ten touchdowns in 1991, and 1,312 receiving yards in 1989.

A tribute to his physical durability, Reed played in 234 NFL games between 1985 and 2000, the 99th most games played by any player in NFL history, including players in less physically demanding positions, including kickers and punters.

Super Bowl records
In his four Super Bowls, Reed recorded 27 receptions, the second most total career Super Bowl receptions in NFL history (behind Rice's 33).  His 323 total Super Bowl receiving yards are the third most in Super Bowl history (behind only Rice's 604 yards and Lynn Swann's 364).

NFL career statistics

Buffalo Bills Wall of Fame
In 2006, Reed was voted into the Buffalo Bills Wall of Fame, joining a number of other players from Bills history whose names are enshrined in cement inside Highmark Stadium. Reed's was inducted in 2009 along with former teammate Bruce Smith and team owner Ralph Wilson. Through the night, Reed was referred to multiple times as "future Hall of Famer" with various speeches voicing their ringing endorsement for Reed as a candidate.

Pro Football Hall of Fame
Reed became eligible for induction into the NFL's Pro Football Hall of Fame, the highest honor afforded a former NFL player, in 2006. However, he was not selected for induction in any of his first seven years of eligibility due partly to a logjam of accomplished wide receiver candidates, including Art Monk, Michael Irvin, and Cris Carter. Although Irvin, Monk and Carter are now enshrined as of 2007, 2008 and 2013 respectively, the logjam became worse for Reed when he was again overlooked in 2009 and 2010, which saw wide receiver candidates Jerry Rice and Tim Brown both eligible for the first time. Rice has long been considered one of the greatest players in league history and was almost assured of being a first-ballot Hall of Famer, making 2010 a long shot for Reed. As expected, Rice was inducted, which cleared some of the logjam going forward for Reed. Reed remained a Hall of Fame candidate in 2011, 2012, and 2013 but was passed over each of those years.

On February 1, 2014, Reed was selected to the Pro Football Hall of Fame, and he was inducted on August 2, 2014.

Television career
Since his NFL retirement in 2000, Reed has provided football commentary on the ESPN2 show, First Take, and appears periodically as a football analyst on NFL on Fox.  He has also appeared on the Spike TV sports series Pros vs. Joes in the show's second season.

He is also known for Hawaii Five-0 where he appeared in "Ka'aelike" (Season 7, Episode 12). He played a federal prosecutor on  MacGyver.  He also appeared on Magnum PI Season 2 Episode 17 as himself and as a car salesman who abuses his uncanny resemblance to Andre Reed.

Philanthropy
The Andre Reed Foundation was established in 2010 to help underprivileged children reach their full potential and become responsible contributors to their communities. Reed is currently a Boys & Girls Clubs of America (BGCA) Ambassador after being inducted to their Hall of Fame in 2015. In addition, he leads up a literacy program for underprivileged youth in the BGCA, called Read with Reed 83 Challenge.

Legacy
On October 18, 2014, Kutztown University, Reed's alma mater, renamed University Field to Andre Reed Stadium in his honor in a ceremony.

Popular culture
Reed is mentioned in the 1996 film Jerry Maguire as one of several NFL wide receivers with lucrative contracts, as Rod Tidwell, a fictional wide receiver for the Arizona Cardinals, played by Cuba Gooding, Jr., tells his agent, played by Tom Cruise, that his contract warrants high pay.

References

External links

 Andre Reed at the Pro Football Hall of Fame
 Andre Reed Buffalo Sports Hall of Fame profile
 

1964 births
Living people
African-American players of American football
American Conference Pro Bowl players
American football wide receivers
Buffalo Bills players
Denver Broncos players
Kutztown Golden Bears football players
Louis E. Dieruff High School alumni
Players of American football from Pennsylvania
Pro Football Hall of Fame inductees
Sportspeople from Allentown, Pennsylvania
Washington Redskins players
21st-century African-American people
20th-century African-American sportspeople
10,000 receiving yards club